Armagh is a city in Northern Ireland. It may also refer to:

County Armagh, one of the traditional counties of Ireland
Armagh (barony)
Armagh City and District Council
Archdiocese of Armagh (disambiguation), one of the ecclesiastical provinces of Ireland
Armagh Observatory
Armagh Planetarium
Armagh railway station

As a constituency:

Armagh (Assembly constituency), used from 1973 until 1986
Armagh Borough (Parliament of Ireland constituency), used until 1801
Armagh County (Parliament of Ireland constituency), used until 1801
Armagh (Northern Ireland Parliament constituency), used from 1921 until 1929
Armagh (UK Parliament constituency), used from 1801 until 1983
Armagh City (UK Parliament constituency), used from 1801 until 1885

It is also the name of places outside Ireland:

In Australia:
Armagh, South Australia

In Canada:
Armagh, Quebec

In Iran:
Armagh, Iran

In New Zealand:
Armagh Street in central Christchurch

In the United States of America:
Armagh, Pennsylvania
Armagh Township, Pennsylvania